The winners of the Star Screen Awards for Best Story are listed below:

List of winners

See also 
 Screen Awards

References 

Screen Awards